A number of ships have been named Persia including

  (1856), a British paddle-steamer 1856–1868
 SS Persia (1881), an American-owned, British-flagged ocean liner, built as SS Coptic
 , a British cargo liner in service 1883–1909, then as a coaling ship until 1928
 , built by Harland and Wolff for Hamburg America Line, in service 1894–1898
 , a British ocean liner in service 1900–1915
 , an Austro-Hungarian, later Italian, passenger-cargo ship, in service 1902–1926
 Persia, a steam tug built 1902 and sunk in collision off the coast of Essex, England on 11 April 1908

See also
 Persia (disambiguation)

References

Ship names